Robert Bowen Cant (24 July 1915 – 13 July 1997) was a British Labour politician.

Early life
Cant was educated at Middlesbrough High School for Boys and the London School of Economics, and served with the Royal Corps of Signals. He became a university lecturer, and wrote American Journey, a study of American high schools.

Political career
Cant was elected a councillor on Stoke-on-Trent City Council in 1953.

He contested Shrewsbury in 1950 and 1951. He was Member of Parliament for Stoke-on-Trent Central from 1966 to 1983, preceding Mark Fisher.

References

The Times Guide to the House of Commons 1966

External links

1915 births
1997 deaths
Alumni of the London School of Economics
English academics
Labour Party (UK) MPs for English constituencies
Royal Corps of Signals soldiers
UK MPs 1966–1970
UK MPs 1970–1974
UK MPs 1974
UK MPs 1974–1979
UK MPs 1979–1983
Councillors in Staffordshire